Azis Tahir Ajdonati was a leading figure in the Albanian movement of Independence and one of the delegates of the Albanian Declaration of Independence, representing the region of Çamëria.

References

See also

Albanian politicians
Year of birth missing
Year of death missing
All-Albanian Congress delegates